Llanfairpwllgwyngyll, or Llanfair Pwllgwyngyll, is a large village and local government community on the island of Anglesey, Wales, on the Menai Strait next to the Britannia Bridge and across the strait from Bangor. Both shortened (Llanfairpwll or Llanfair PG) and lengthened forms of the placename are used in various contexts (with the longer form pronounced ).

At the 2011 Census, the population was 3,107, of whom 71% could speak Welsh. It is the sixth largest settlement on the island by population.

The long form of the name, with 58 characters split into 18 syllables, is purported to be the longest place name in Europe and the second longest one-word place name in the world.

History

There has been human activity and settlement in the area of the village since the Neolithic era (4000–2000 BC), with subsistence agriculture and fishing the most common occupations for much of its early history. The island of Anglesey was at that point reachable only by boat across the Menai Strait. A largely destroyed, collapsed dolmen can be found from this period in the parish, located at Ty Mawr north of the present-day church; early Ordnance Survey maps show a long cairn on the site. The probable remains of a hillfort, with a fragmentary bank and ditch, were recorded on an outcrop known as Craig y Ddinas.

The area was briefly invaded and captured by the Romans under Gaius Suetonius Paulinus, temporarily abandoned in order to consolidate forces against Boudicca, then held until the end of Roman Britain.

With the withdrawal of the Roman forces, the area fell under the control of the early medieval Kingdom of Gwynedd. There has likely been a small Christian religious site, perhaps a monastic cell, in the area since the 7th century. Surveys of the later medieval period show that the tenants of the township of Pwllgwyngyll, as it was then known, held a total of 9 bovates of land from the Bishop of Bangor under the feudal system. A church was built during the medieval period and dedicated to Mary, probably under Norman influence: the building, later demolished and replaced by a Victorian-era church, was unusual in having a semi-circular apse, a feature more usually associated with cathedrals. Despite religious activity, the rural nature of the settlement meant that the parish had a population of only around 80 in 1563.

Much of the land was absorbed into the Earldom of Uxbridge, which later became the Marquisate of Anglesey, and was subject to enclosures. In 1844, for example, 92% of the land in Llanfairpwll was owned by just three individuals. The population of the parish reached 385 by 1801.

In 1826, Anglesey was connected to the rest of Wales by the construction of the Menai Suspension Bridge by Thomas Telford, and connected with London in 1850 with the building of the Britannia Bridge and the busy North Wales Coast railway line, which connected the rest of Great Britain to the ferry port of Holyhead.

The first meeting of the Women's Institute took place in Llanfairpwll in 1915, and the movement (which began in Canada) then spread through the rest of the British Isles.

Placename and toponymy
The suffixing of the township name to that of the church would have served to distinguish the parish from the many other sites dedicated to Mary in Wales.

Longer versions of the name are thought to have first been used in the 19th century in an attempt to develop the village as a commercial and tourist centre. The long form of the name is the longest place name in the United Kingdom and one of the longest in the world at 58 characters (51 "letters" since "ch" and "ll" are digraphs, and are treated as single letters in the Welsh language).

19th century renaming

The long name was supposedly contrived in 1869 as an early publicity stunt to give the station the longest name of any railway station in Britain. According to Sir John Morris-Jones the name was created by a local tailor, whose name he did not confide, letting the secret die with him. This form of the name adds a reference to the whirlpool in the Menai Strait known as the Swellies and to the small chapel of St. Tysilio, located on a nearby island.

Literally translated, the long form of the name means: "[The] church of [St.] Mary [of the] pool of the white hazels near to [lit. "over against"] the fierce whirlpool [and] the church of [St.] Tysilio of the red cave". Various elements have occasionally been translated differently, for example "the white pool among the hazel trees" or "the cave of St Tysilio the Red".

Pronunciation
The sound  is absent from many dialects of Modern English, but existed in older versions of English and is retained in a few modern dialects (such as Scottish English).

The ⟨ll⟩ is a voiceless alveolar lateral fricative , a sound that has never occurred in English.

Tourism and attractions
A few thousand local residents welcome about 200,000 visitors per year. The most popular attraction is the Llanfairpwll railway station that features the plate with the full name of the village. Other places of interest in the area include Anglesey Sea Zoo, Bryn Celli Ddu Burial Chamber, St. Tysilio's Church, and Plas Cadnant Hidden Gardens.

In science
In 2020, a new species of bacteria isolated from soil collected in the parish of the village was placed in the Myxococcus genus and was named Myxococcus .

In popular culture
The name was submitted to Guinness World Records as the longest word to appear in a published cryptic crossword, having been used by compiler Roger Squires in 1979. The clue was "Giggling troll follows Clancy, Larry, Billy and Peggy who howl, wrongly disturbing a place in Wales (58)", where all but the last five words formed an anagram.

In his 1957 appearance on You Bet Your Life, the Welsh academic John Hughes answered host Groucho Marx's question about the location of his birthplace by mentioning the town.

In 2002, the village's website was listed as the longest URL on the Internet.

Part of the song's humor stems from the singer's attempts to catch her breath after repeatedly singing the unwieldy place names.

In 1995, Welsh band Super Furry Animals released its debut EP,  (In Space).

The computer game Civilization V awards the "Longest. Name. Ever." Steam achievement to players for having a city named .

In the 1968 movie Barbarella, Dildano proposes that the password for a meeting is "".

In the 1980s, the village's name was the subject of a question on the American quiz show $ale of the Century.  Host Jim Perry later showed a giant cue card bearing the name of the village, he explained what each part of the name meant before joking "and it's pronounced...exactly the way you think it is!"

In September 2015, Channel 4 News weatherman Liam Dutton went viral around the world after accurately pronouncing the name of the town in one of his forecasts.

Climate
The village has a temperate oceanic climate (Köppen Cfb; Trewartha Do), with mild summers and cool, wet winters.

Notable people
 Wilfred Mitford Davies (1895–1966) Welsh artist and publisher, went to school in the town.
 Sir John "Kyffin" Williams, KBE, RA (1918–2006) Welsh landscape painter, lived at Pwllfanogl, Llanfairpwll.
 Lady Rose McLaren (1919–2005) aristocrat, 4th daughter of the 6th Marquess of Anglesey, resided in Plas Newydd
 John Lasarus Williams (1924–2004), known as John L, was a Welsh nationalist activist.
 Naomi Watts (born 1968), English actress and film producer, lived in the town as a child.
 Taron Egerton (born 1989), Welsh actor, went to school in the town.
 Siobhan Owen (born 1993), soprano and harpist from Llanfairpwll who now lives in Adelaide, emigrated aged two.
 Elin Fflur (born 1984), Welsh singer-songwriter, television and radio presenter.

See also
Llanfairpwll F.C., the village's football club
List of long place names

Notes

References

External links

  Listed in the 2002 Guinness Book of Records as the world's longest valid Internet domain name
 
 
 
 
 Newscaster pronouncing the full name

 
Villages in Anglesey